Mozilla Japan is a limited liability organization to help promote and deploy Mozilla products in Japan.

Mozilla Japan was founded on August 18, 2004. It is independent of the Mozilla Foundation, but is affiliated with them.

The organization is run by its board of directors, which is made up of Hideo Aiso of the Tokyo Institute of Technology, Hideyuki Tokuda of Keio University, Nobuo Kita, Hideki Sunahara of the Nara Institute of Science and Technology, Satoko Takita (chair) and Joichi Ito of the Mozilla Foundation.

As well as promoting Mozilla in Japan, the organization is also responsible for the Japanese localisation of Mozilla products, which includes translating and customizing them for a Japanese audience.

Foxkeh
 is a mascot created by Mozilla Japan to help introduce Firefox to new users in Japan. Foxkeh is a Japanese red fox with a flame for a tail - a "firefox". The name combines the English word "fox" with the suffix "suke" (すけ; 助, 輔, 介) found in some Japanese male names.

External links
Mozilla Japan
Foxkeh's blog
Foxkeh's blog - Japanese

Mozilla
Organizations established in 2004